St Paul's Church, Lozells is a Grade II listed redundant parish church in the Church of England in Birmingham now used by the Assemblies of the First Born Church of God.

History

The foundation stone was laid on 11 July 1879 by Colonel Ratcliff and the building was constructed by Horsman and Co of Wolverhampton to designs by J. A. Chatwin. The church was consecrated on 11 September 1880 by the Bishop of Worcester.

The building was sold by the Church of England in 1982 and acquired by the Assemblies of the First Born Church of God. The Church of England congregation merged with that of St Silas’ Church, Lozells, and a new building was commissioned for this joint parish.

Organ

The church contained an organ dating from 1889 by Casson. A specification of the organ can be found on the National Pipe Organ Register.

References

External links 

 

Church of England church buildings in Birmingham, West Midlands
Grade II listed buildings in Birmingham
Churches completed in 1880
Former Church of England church buildings
Church buildings converted to a different denomination
Grade II listed churches in the West Midlands (county)